Sir Salimullah Medical College (SSMC) is a public medical college in Dhaka, Bangladesh. The medical college has been producing quality physicians, eminent researchers and health policy makers who are currently working in different medical sectors at home and abroad. It includes Mitford Hospital, which is the oldest hospital in the country and one of the earliest hospitals in this subcontinent from where the evolution of medical education started. Mitford Hospital Established in 1857.

Students Organization 

 Sandhani-"Donate Blood,Save life"
 LEO-"Be great,Be LEO"
 Companion Band-"The name of feelings"(Campus Authorized Band.)
 Sir Salimullah Medical College Debating Club.

Academic Facilities

The library is situated on the ground floor of new academic building with a large collection of medical books. SSMC has a developing library section with books about educational innovations, educational psychology, instructional techniques, curriculum development, curriculum evaluation etc. Many WHO and other publications on Human Resource Development for health are also available. The library is enriched with more than 150 journals and 23000 medical books.

Journal 
Sir Salimullah Medical College Journal is a biannual journal published by the editorial board on behalf of Sir Salimullah Medical College Teachers’ Association. Each issue includes editorial, original articles, review articles and case reports of exceptional merit on any discipline of medical science. It is a peer-reviewed, open access journal which is listed in the MEDLINE database.

Alumni association 
Sir Salimullah Medical College graduates have a strong alumni presence in USA, UK and Canada. SSMC Alumni Association Abroad is an organization of the alumni who are currently living abroad. The association is involved in exchange of skills and education with the college. They provide scholarship every year to the students of SSMC. The organization responds to national and international crisis, they made donations towards the victims of east coast natural disaster and famine-stricken children of Somalia.

Notable alumni
 Prof. Dr. Abul Bashar Mohammed Khurshid Alam, eminent surgeon, Director General of Directorate General of Health Services
 Dr. Sezan Mahmud, writer, lyricist, columnist, Professor of Medicine at the University of Central Florida College of Medicine
 Dr. Azharul Haque, intellectual killed in the Bangladesh Liberation War
 Dr. Rakhal Chandra Das, intellectual killed in the Bangladesh Liberation War
 Dr. Moin Uddin Ahmed, politician, Member of Parliament
 Benoy Krishna Basu, Indian Freedom Fighter

See also

 List of medical colleges in Bangladesh

References

External links
 

Old Dhaka
Medical colleges in Bangladesh
Universities and colleges in Dhaka
Hospitals in Dhaka
Educational institutions established in 1875
1875 establishments in India